Patrick J. Donahoe is a United States Army major general who last served as the Commanding General of the United States Army Maneuver Center of Excellence and Fort Benning from July 17, 2020 to July 14, 2022. As the MCoE commander, Donahoe was responsible for the command and administration of the Army's branch specialty academies. He previously served as deputy commanding general for operations of the Eighth United States Army. He currently is serving as Special Assistant to the Commanding General, Training and Doctrine Command, Joint Base Langley-Eustis, Virginia with duty at Fort Benning, Georgia. Donahoe had his retirement put on pause while the service completes an investigation into alleged misconduct focused on his social media use. Donahoe had publicly disagreed with Fox News host Tucker Carlson who had said that the DOD was "feminizing" the military through uniform policy changes for women, which has come under scrutiny as Donahoe has failed to punish Officers for inappropriately harassing and sexually assaulting female Soldiers.

References

Date of birth missing (living people)
Year of birth missing (living people)
Living people
People from New Jersey
Villanova University alumni
Harvard Kennedy School alumni
Recipients of the Defense Superior Service Medal
Recipients of the Legion of Merit
United States Army generals